Rev is an album by Jane's Addiction vocalist Perry Farrell, released in 1999. It is a combination of solo work and a best-of for the singer's bands.

Background
To fulfill requirements on a contract with Warner Bros. Records, this album was produced with a combination of solo, Jane's Addiction, and Porno for Pyros recordings. Originally, the solo tracks were intended for a side project called "Gobalee". The title track features Tom Morello and John Frusciante on guitars. Farrell signed with Virgin Records shortly after Rev's release.

Track listing
"Rev"
"Whole Lotta Love"
"Been Caught Stealing" [12" Remix Version]
"Jane Says"
"Stop" (Edit)
"Mountain Song"
"Summertime Rolls"
"Kimberly Austin"
"Tonight"
"Tahitian Moon"
"Pets"
"Cursed Male"
"100 Ways"
"Hard Charger" (Edit)
"Ripple"
"Satellite of Love"

Promo
"Rev"
"Been Caught Stealing" [12" Remix Version]
"Kimberly Austin"
"Satellite of Love"

References

1999 compilation albums
Perry Farrell albums
albums produced by Dave Jerden
Warner Records compilation albums